Sam J. Miller (born February 7, 1979) is an American science fiction, fantasy and horror short fiction author.  His stories have appeared in publications such as Clarkesworld, Asimov's Science Fiction, and Lightspeed, along with over 15 "year's best" story collections.  He was finalist for multiple Nebula Awards along with the World Fantasy and Theodore Sturgeon Memorial Awards. He won the 2013 Shirley Jackson Award for his short story "57 Reasons for the Slate Quarry Suicides." His debut novel, The Art of Starving, was published in 2017 and his novel Blackfish City won the 2019 John W. Campbell Memorial Award.

Life
Sam J. Miller grew up in Hudson, New York, where his family ran a butcher shop. He grew up Jewish and lives with his husband in New York City, where he works as a community organizer for a homelessness organization.

Career
Miller studied writing as part at the 2012 Clarion Workshop under authors Holly Black, Cassandra Clare and Ted Chiang.

Miller began regularly publishing his short stories in 2013 with "57 Reasons for the Slate Quarry Suicides" in Nightmare Magazine. The story later won the 2013 Shirley Jackson Award for best short fiction. His other stories have been published in magazines such as Clarkesworld, Asimov's Science Fiction, Apex Magazine, and Lightspeed. His stories have been reprinted in over 15 "year's best" story collections and have been a finalist for multiple Nebula Awards along with the World Fantasy and Theodore Sturgeon Memorial Awards.

Miller states that he writes "speculative fiction because that's how the world looks to me. Life is magic. Human society is horror. The world is science fiction." While Miller deals with politics in his work as a community organizer, he says that "arguing a political point is a pretty good way to kill a story. But I do think it's possible to explore in fiction the issues that are important to us. That's the writing that excites me the most."

Miller's prose has been called "evocative", "disturbing" and "grim stuff, but compelling".

Miller's young adult novel The Art of Starving was released by HarperCollins in July 2017. The novel is about a gay, bullied teenage boy who believes that extreme hunger awakens supernatural abilities and is rooted in Miller's own experience with an adolescent eating disorder. It was a finalist for the World Science Fiction Society award for Best Young Adult novel and won the Andre Norton Award for Young Adult Science Fiction and Fantasy in 2018.

His first novel for adults, Blackfish City, was released in April 2018 by Ecco Press. His second young adult novel, Destroy All Monsters, was published by HarperTeen in 2019. His second adult novel, The Blade Between, was published by Ecco Press in 2020.

Miller's first short-fiction collection, Boys, Beasts & Men, was published in May 2022 by Tachyon Publications. It contains previously published and new stories with an introduction written by Amal El-Mohtar.

Awards and nominations
 "The Beasts We Want To Be" (short story in Electric Velocipede, Winter 2013) was nominated for the 2014 Locus Award for Best Short Story
 "57 Reasons for the Slate Quarry Suicides" (short story in Nightmare Magazine, December 2013) won the 2013 Shirley Jackson Award for best short fiction.
 "We Are the Cloud" (novelette in Lightspeed, August 2014) was a finalist for the 2014 Nebula Award for Best Novelette and the 2015 Theodore Sturgeon Memorial Award.
 "When Your Child Strays from God" (short story in Clarkesworld, July 2015) was a finalist for the 2015 Nebula Award for Best Short Story.
 "The Heat of Us: Notes Toward an Oral History" (short story in Clarkesworld, July 2015) was a finalist for the 2016 World Fantasy Award for best short fiction.
 "Calved" (short story in Asimov's Science Fiction, September 2015) was third-placed in the 2016 Asimov's Reader Poll for best short story
 "Angel, Monster, Man" (short story in Nightmare Magazine, January 2016) was a finalist for the 2017 Shirley Jackson Award for best novelette
 "Things With Beards" (short story in Clarkesworld, June 2016) was a finalist for the 2016 Nebula Award for Best Short Story and the Shirley Jackson Award for best short fiction, and was third-placed for the 2017 Theodore Sturgeon Award
 The Art of Starving (HarperCollins, 2017) won the 2018 Andre Norton Award, and was shortlisted for the 2018 IAFA William L. Crawford Fantasy Award for best first fantasy novel, the 2018 Lodestar Award for Best Young Adult Book and the 2018 Locus Award for Best First Novel
 Blackfish City (Ecco Press, 2018) won the 2018 John W. Campbell Memorial Award for Best Science Fiction Novel and was nominated for the Nebula Award for Best Novel and the Locus Award for Best Science Fiction Novel
 Destroy All Monsters (HarperTeen, 2020) was a finalist for the 2020 Locus Award for Best Young Adult Book
 "Let All the Children Boogie" (Tor.com chapbook, January 2021) was a finalist for the 2022 Locus Award for Best Short Story and the Nebula Award for Best Short Story

Bibliography

Novels
 The Art of Starving (HarperCollins, 2017)
 Blackfish City (Ecco Press, 2018)
 Destroy All Monsters (HarperTeen, 2019)
 The Blade Between (Ecco Press, 2020)

Collections
 Boys, Beasts & Men (Tachyon Publications, 2022)

Short fiction

References

External links
 
 

Living people
1979 births
American science fiction writers
American male writers
American gay writers
American LGBT novelists
Jewish American writers
LGBT Jews
LGBT people from New York (state)
21st-century American Jews
21st-century American novelists
Novelists from New York (state)
Writers of young adult science fiction